One of two golf courses within North Berwick, the West Links is by far the more renowned. It regularly holds various championships and is used as a qualifying venue when The Open Championship is held at Muirfield (most recently 2013). It was opened in 1832 and occupies a place at the centre of golfing history.

History
The area which is home to the course today - a strip of land adjacent to the beach and extending westward over 2 miles from the edge of the town centre to the nature reserve at Yellowcraigs - has been used for golf for at least 400 years, although early participants were not welcomed by local landowners or authorities. The course was officially opened in 1832 with 6 holes, necessitating competitions to be played over 3 rounds. After a period of expansion which began in 1868, the course featured 18 holes by 1877 and was extended to a "full length" of 6095 yards in 1895. The last major alteration to the course was masterminded by Ben Sayers in 1932, since which time the layout of the course has hardly changed. Today the course measures 6,420 yards.

Clubs
Four golf clubs are based at the West Links - the North Berwick Golf Club (founded 1832), Tantallon Golf Club (1853), Bass Rock Golf Club (1873) and the North Berwick Ladies Golf Club (1888). The North Berwick G.C. is the 13th oldest club in the world and only St. Andrews has a club which has continuously played over the same course for longer. In 2005 it voted to give ladies full rights as members for the first time - ironic as it was originally the first club in the world to allow ladies to become members.

Holes

Its signature hole is thought by many to be the 15th, "Redan", a par-3 which starts with a blind tee-shot over a valley towards the green which is perched on a hill beyond and tilted away and to the left. The design of the hole has been copied on several newer courses around the world, particularly in Japan. One of the earliest copies of the Redan hole is the 7th at Shinnecock Hills, famous for the trouble it caused players during the 2004 U.S. Open.  The Redan at North Berwick is preceded  (see map) by an heroic stretch of three holes:  The 12th hole "Bass" which requires a knowledgeable tee shot in order to afford the best angle into the green, the 13th hole "Pit" where an ancient stone wall fronts a relatively small green, and the blind-approach 14th hole "Perfection" which can yield a wide range of scores even in ideal conditions.  The 16th hole "Gate" features a divided green, with two raised surfaces divided by a punishing valley, a rare feature in the golfing world because of the lack of courage among modern architects to propose such a hole to golf course developers.

Facilities
The North Berwick Golf Club and the Tantallon Golf Club both maintain clubhouses, the former with the prime location off the 18th green and the latter just over the road. Both clubhouses have changing rooms and dining facilities. As part of "The Sayers Project", the NBGC is planning to expand their clubhouse to include better leisure facilities. They also intend to incorporate the David Huish Pro Shop into the main building and use the site currently occupied by the shop for state-of-the-art practice bays and swing analysis technology.

At the far end of the course there is a practice area within the loop created by the 8th, 9th, 10th and 11th holes. The area features a driving / iron play field (no automatic ball retrieval) and a multi-hole putting green.

Literature
In 1980 Alistair Beaton Adamson, a lifelong member of the club, wrote a history of the club entitled "In the wind's eye" with humour and deep appreciation of the important part the course has played on the world golfing stage.  The book includes many b&w photos, colour illustrations and a plethora of facts.  It is now very rare and cherished by those lucky enough to own a copy.

Golf clubs and courses in East Lothian
North Berwick